The men's 200 metre breaststroke event at the 1968 Summer Olympics was held from 21 to 22 October 1968 at the Alberca Olímpica Francisco Márquez.

Records
Prior to this competition, the existing world and Olympic records were as follows.

Competition format

The competition consists of two rounds: heats and a final. The swimmers with the best eight times in the heats advance to the final.

Schedule
All times are Central Time Zone (UTC-6)

Results

Heats
Heat 1

Heat 2

Heat 3

Heat 4

Heat 5

Final

References

Men's breaststroke 200 metre
Men's events at the 1968 Summer Olympics